Krishna Levy, born on May 27, 1964, in New Delhi (India), is a French film score composer. He studied music in USA but lives and works in Paris (France).

Filmography (selection) 
1995 : Fast directed by Dante Desarthe.
1996 : Comment je me suis disputé... (ma vie sexuelle) directed by Arnaud Desplechin.
1999 : Karnaval directed by Thomas Vincent.
2000 : Cours toujours directed by Dante Desarthe.
2001 : Ali Zaoua, prince de la rue directed by Nabil Ayouch.
2001 : Quand on sera grand directed by Renaud Cohen 
2002 : 8 Women (8 Femmes) directed by François Ozon.
2004 : Je suis un assassin directed by Thomas Vincent.
2004 : Le Dernier Trappeur directed by Nicolas Vanier.
2006 : Je me fais rare directed by Dante Desarthe.
2006 : The Fall directed by Tarsem Singh.
2007 : Contre-enquête directed by Franck Mancuso.
2008 : Whatever Lola Wants directed by Nabil Ayouch.
2008 : Le Nouveau Protocole directed by Thomas Vincent.
2009 : Je l'aimais directed by Zabou Breitman
2009 :  directed by Nicolas Vanier.
2011 : 1, 2, 3, voleurs directed by Gilles Mimouni (TV)
2012 : Je fais feu de tout bois directed by Dante Desarthe.
2013 : Dancing in Jaffa directed by Hilla Medalia.

Awards
2003 : Étoile d'or du compositeur de musique originale de films, for his score for the movie 8 Women, by François Ozon.
2001 : Prix "Mozart du 7ème art" at Festival d'Auxerre for Ali Zaoua, prince de la rue, by Nabil Ayouch.

External links 
 Krishna Levy fan site (in both French and English)
 Krishna Levy on Internet Movie Database

References 
 Interviews at krishnalevy.free.fr
 CD booklets

1964 births
French film score composers
French male film score composers
Living people